The 1896 United States presidential election in Florida took place on November 3, 1896. All contemporary 45 states were part of the 1896 United States presidential election. Florida voters chose four electors to the Electoral College, which selected the president and vice president.

Florida was won by the Democratic nominees, former U.S. Representative William Jennings Bryan of Nebraska and his running mate Arthur Sewall of Maine.

Results

Results by county

Notes

References

Florida
1896
1896 Florida elections